Deblois Flight Strip  is a public-use airport located two nautical miles (3.7 km) southeast of the central business district of Deblois, a town in Washington County, Maine, United States. It is currently owned by the Maine Department of Transportation, and managed by Randy Gray, Superintendent of Operations for the Eastern Region.

History 
The airport was built by the United States Army Air Forces about 1942 as an emergency landing airfield for military aircraft on training flights.    It was closed after World War II, and was turned over for local government use by the War Assets Administration (WAA).

Facilities and aircraft 
It has one runway designated 15/33 with an asphalt surface measuring 3,520 by 75 feet (1,073 x 23 m). For the 12-month period ending August 12, 2008, the airport had 100 general aviation aircraft operations, an average of 8 per month.

References

External links 

 Aerial image as of 16 May 1996 from USGS The National Map
 

Airports in Washington County, Maine
Airfields of the United States Army Air Forces in Maine
Flight Strips of the United States Army Air Forces